KFFK (1390 AM) is a radio station broadcasting a Spanish News/Talk format. It is licensed to Rogers, Arkansas, United States, and serves the Fayetteville (Northwest Arkansas) area.  The station is owned by John Lykins and Steve Butler, through licensee Rox Radio Group, LLC.

External links

FFK
Radio stations established in 1954
1954 establishments in Arkansas